Epiphyas hemiphoena is a species of moth of the family Tortricidae. It is found in Australia, where it has been recorded from Tasmania. The habitat consists of mixed wet forests.

The wingspan is about 23 mm.

References

Moths described in 1927
Epiphyas